The Agriculture Act 1947 was an Act of Parliament in the United Kingdom passed by Clement Attlee's post-war Labour government.

Background
The government wanted a positive balance of payments, to lower the amount of food imported into Britain from dollar countries and to promote the maximum agricultural productivity.

Content
The Act gave farmers an assured market and guaranteed prices for their produce, the objective of this being, in the words of the Minister of Agriculture Tom Williams, "to promote a healthy and efficient agriculture capable of producing that part of the nation's food which is required from home sources at the lowest price consistent with the provision of adequate remuneration and decent living conditions for farmers and workers, with a reasonable return on capital invested".

Significance
The Act was a success: in 1938-1939 the output of agricultural machinery in Britain was valued at £2,500,000 (£1,400,000 of this was exports); in 1951 output was over £100,000,000, half of which was exported. In addition, the legislation provided farmers with a degree of prosperity and security not known since the mid-nineteenth century, and they benefited from the guaranteed price and annual price review introduced under the Act. Guaranteed markets also absorbed agriculture "into an effective system of economic planning".

Notes

References
Kenneth O. Morgan, Labour in Power. 1945-1951 (Oxford: Clarendon Press, 1984).
Viscount Addison, How the Labour Party has saved Agriculture. The Story of Six Great Years (Labour Party Publications, 1951).

United Kingdom Acts of Parliament 1947
Agriculture legislation in the United Kingdom